The 2010 Marburg Open was a professional tennis tournament played on outdoor red clay courts. It was part of the 2010 ATP Challenger Tour. It took place in Marburg, Germany between 21 and 27 June 2010.

ATP entrants

Seeds

 Rankings are as of June 14, 2010.

Other entrants
The following players received wildcards into the singles main draw:
  Matthias Bachinger
  Peter Gojowczyk
  Sebastian Rieschick
  Cedrik-Marcel Stebe

The following players received entry from the qualifying draw:
  Aliaksandr Bury
  Grigor Dimitrov
  Gero Kretschmer
  Guillaume Rufin

The following players received lucky loser spots:
  Ilya Belyaev
  Conor Niland

Champions

Singles

 Simone Vagnozzi def.  Ivo Minář, 2–6, 6–3, 7–5

Doubles

 Matthias Bachinger /  Denis Gremelmayr def.  Guillermo Olaso /  Grega Žemlja, 6–4, 6–4

References
Official website
ITF search 

Marburg Open
2010 in German tennis
Marburg Open